Karen B. Ray is a  former Republican member of the North Carolina General Assembly who represented the state's ninety-fifth House district, including constituents in Catawba and Iredell counties.  Ray was a court reporter from Mooresville, North Carolina, and Iredell County commissioner, prior to her election to the assembly. After winning the Republican primary, she was unopposed in the 2002 general election for her seat.

Electoral history

2008

2006

2004

2002

References

Living people
Year of birth missing (living people)
People from Mooresville, North Carolina
21st-century American politicians
21st-century American women politicians
County commissioners in North Carolina
Women state legislators in North Carolina
Republican Party members of the North Carolina House of Representatives